Caulanthus amplexicaulis is a species of flowering plant in the family Brassicaceae known by the common name claspingleaf wild cabbage.

It is endemic to California, where it grows on open slopes in the Transverse Ranges and Outer South California Coast Ranges.

Description
Caulanthus amplexicaulis is an annual herb that produces a slender erect stem with flat, oval leaves clasping it toward the base.

The bulbous purple flower forms a rounded pouch which opens at the top, with the narrow petal tips reflexed back. The outer petal tips are deep purple; the inner tips are much lighter and can be nearly white.

The fruit is a very long silique which may exceed 10 centimeters in length.

Varieties
There are two varieties of this species. 
Caulanthus amplexicaulis var. barbarae — Santa Barbara jewelflower; endemic to the serpentine soils of the San Rafael Mountains in central Santa Barbara County. The sepals forming the rounded pouch of the flower are white to cream in color, as opposed to the bright purple of the more common variety.
Caulanthus amplexicaulis var. amplexicaulis — endemic to the Transverse Ranges.

See also
California chaparral and woodlands — ecoregion.
Flora of the California chaparral and woodlands

References

External links
Jepson Manual Treatment  of Caulanthus amplexicaulis
USDA Plants Profile: Caulanthus amplexicaulis (jewelflower)
Caulanthus amplexicaulis — U.C. Photo gallery

amplexicaulis
Endemic flora of California
Natural history of the California chaparral and woodlands
Natural history of the California Coast Ranges
Natural history of the Santa Monica Mountains
Natural history of the Transverse Ranges
~
~
Flora without expected TNC conservation status